Montgomery County Public Schools (MCPS) is a public school district that serves Montgomery County, Maryland. With 210 schools in 2023, it is the largest school district in the state of Maryland. For the 2022–23 school year, the district had about 160,554 students taught by about 13,994 teachers, 86.4 percent of whom had a master's degree or equivalent. The district receives about half of the county's budget: 46% in 2022.

As of 2022, the superintendent of schools is Dr. Monifa McKnight The Board of Education includes a student member, elected by all secondary students, who votes on all issues except punishment for individuals; in 2022–23, the student board member is Arvin Kim.

In 2010, MCPS was awarded a Malcolm Baldrige National Quality Award.

History

1800s–1940s 
Only private schools existed in Montgomery County until 1860, when the public school district was established for white children. The outbreak of the Civil War the following year brought raids by both Union and Confederate forces on local schools, which ultimately closed from 1862 until 1864.

In 1872, the Maryland General Assembly appropriated state money to open schools for children of color. The county established a segregated school system.

In 1892, the county opened its first high school, Rockville High School, which graduated its first class of 12 seniors graduated in 1897. (In 1927, Rockville Colored High School would open, after which the older whites-only school changed its name to Richard Montgomery High School.) A second high school, Gaithersburg High School, was established in 1904.

In the 1900s, the school budget started to see the effects of suburbanization. The school system saw more growth in 1912 after the United States Congress passed a "non-resident" law that excluded Montgomery County school children from enrolling in Washington, D.C. schools, which were known for their higher quality.

The county's first Board of Education was named by legislative enactments in 1917; the first Board consisted of nine men.  A woman was appointed to the board in 1920: Mrs. A. Dawson Trumble, who served a five-year term that led to a steady succession of female members.

Edwin W. Broome, superintendent during 1916–1953, combined one-room schoolhouses into multi-room operations at the beginning of his tenure, reducing the number of schools from 108 to 66 by 1949. At that point, school enrollment was over 22,000. When Broome took the job, there were five high schools, all in the northern portion of the county. He built two secondary schools for Silver Spring and two for Bethesda, and also pushed high schools to add the 12th grade.

1950s–present
In the early 1950s, elementary students of color attended one of four elementary schoolsLinden, Ken-Gar, Takoma Park, and River Roadall of which were considered substandard. Older students of color attended Lincoln Junior High School and George Washington Carver High School in Rockville. Montgomery County was the one of the first seven counties in Maryland to start to desegregate its public schools, which it began in September 1955, following the Brown v. Board of Education ruling by the Supreme Court of the United States that ordered the desegregation of all schools nationwide. Montgomery County completed the integration of its schools in 1960–1961.

In 1961, the school system had 85,000 students and a  budget, having become the largest system in the Washington suburbs.
Before 1961, separate schools were maintained for black children. At that time, Rockville's George Washington Carver High School students were rezoned to the previously all-white schools across the county.

MCPS saw enrollment numbers peak in 1972 when they reached 127,912. However, enrollment decreased over the next ten years, hitting a low of 91,030 in 1983. This prompted the closure of 60 schools. However, with more than 96,000 students and 13,000 staff members in 155 schools in 1986, the school system was still one of the 20 largest in the nation. Enrollment was over 100,000 by 1990.

Dr. Paul L. Vance became the county's first black superintendent in 1991 when there were 107,000 students and 174 schools. When he left in 1999, MCPS had 129,000 students in 185 schools. Over the next ten years, enrollment grew to more than 150,000.

In 2014, the Board modified the school calendar to remove all references to the Christian and Jewish religious holidays of Christmas, Easter, Yom Kippur, and Rosh Hashanah. The amendment was in response to a campaign by the initiative "Equality for Eid" (E4E), which sought for Montgomery County Public School closures on the Muslim holidays of Eid al-Fitr and Eid al-Adha.
The amendment received some media attention. Criticism of the amendment came from a variety of sources, including Montgomery County Executive Isiah Leggett and Congressman John Delaney.

For the 2022–2023 school year, the district has 209 schools and an enrollment of 160,564 students.

Governance and budget 
MCPS funding comes mostly from Montgomery County (66%) and the State of Maryland (27%), with additional funds from federal government grants (3%), enterprise funds (3%), and other sources (1%).

MCPS, which covers the entire county as its school district, is governed by a Board of Education that sets goals, establishes policies, and allocates resources.

In 1977, the Maryland General Assembly amended Section 3-901 of the Education Article of the Annotated Code of the Public General Laws of Maryland to create a seat for a student on the eight-member board of education with a one-year term. From 1978 until 1982, a small representative assembly of students selected the student member. The first was David Naimon, who served during the 1978–1979 school year. Traci Williams, who served during the 1980–1981 school year, was the first African American to serve as a student member. After Williams died in December 2008, the MCPS board released a declaration recognizing her effect on the county.

Since 1982, the student member has been directly elected by vote of all MCPS secondary students (i.e., those in middle and high schools). Kurt Hirsch, the first student member directly elected by secondary students, served during the 1982–1983 school year. During the 1989 session of the Maryland General Assembly, Section 3-901 was again amended and established a limited vote for the student member. In 1995, Charles McCullough was the first African American to be directly elected as a student member of the board, serving during the 1995–1996 school year.

Since 2016, the student member has had full voting rights, except for votes to punish individuals. The student member of the board can vote on matters related to collective bargaining, capital and operating budgets, and school closings, re–openings, and boundaries. The student member of the board receives a $5,000 college scholarship, student service learning hours, and one honors-level social studies credit.

The Board of Education student member for the 2022–2023 school year is Arvin Kim, a junior at Walt Whitman High School. Kim was elected by 58.7 percent of the nearly 56,000 students who voted.

The board's current members are:

Students 
The MCPS student population has continued to grow over the years. The district saw a record enrollment of 160,564 students at the start of the 2022–2023 school year. MCPS serves a diverse student body, with 32.8% Hispanic, 25.8% White, 21.8% Black, 14.3% Asian, .1% Native Hawaiian or Other Pacific Islander, and 5.0% two or more races.

Graduates from the class of 2018 earned $364 million in college scholarships, an increase of more than $14 million over the previous year.

The class of 2017 outperformed their peers in the state of Maryland, and the nation as a whole, on Advanced Placement (AP) exams, based on AP Cohort Results released by the College Board. In 2017, more than 7,000 MCPS graduates (66%) took one or more AP exams. The percentage of students receiving a college-ready score of 3 or higher on at least one exam rose to 52%, higher than the 31% of the public school graduates in Maryland and 23% of the national graduates.

The total number of AP tests taken declined from 41,048 in 2019 to 31,750 in 2021. Passing scores increased from 71.5% in 2019 to 75.1% in 2020; however, they declined again in 2021 to 68.1%.

Academics 
MCPS has established certain criteria for students to graduate high school. Students must achieve 22 credits to graduate, with each semester course worth 0.5 credits. The necessary credits include, among others, the following requirements for the class of 2025:
 4 credits — English. 
 4 credits — Math: At least 1 Algebra and 1 Geometry.
 3 credits — Science: At least 1 Life science (e.g., Biology) and 1 Physical science.
 3 credits — Social studies: 1 credit each of Government, U.S. history, and World history.
 1 credit — Technology: Students can choose among Computer Science, Engineering, or other technology-related courses.
 Other credit requirements include: Physical Education, Health Education, Fine arts, and Electives.

In addition to these credit requirements, other requirements for graduation include four years of enrollment, student service learning, and assessments.

During the 2017–2018 school year, the district launched data dashboards to focus on learning, accountability, and results. Continuous monitoring of students' progress ensures that students have timely support, focused interventions, acceleration, and enrichment. Readiness data helps the district to monitor students' progress and plan accordingly.

The district has emphasized preparing students for both college and career. In April 2018, the College Board and Project Lead the Way awarded more than 3,000 students in the U.S. for their accomplishments in the 2016–2017 school year. Compared to other school districts, MCPS had the most students who'd earned the AP + PLTW Student Achievements, followed by districts in Illinois and Texas, and its neighboring Howard County Public School System in Maryland. Wheaton High School, which focuses on project-based learning, had the second-most students with the achievement, behind Adlai E. Stevenson High School in Illinois.

Every high school offers courses linked to a variety of careers. A program implemented at Magruder High School during the 2018–2019 school year allows students to get a head start on careers in aviation.

In May 2018, students from Northwest High School were the first in the district to graduate with a two-year degree in general engineering from Montgomery College as well as a high school diploma. In May 2018, five Northwood High School students were the first MCPS students to complete the Middle College Program at their school, which allowed them to earn an associate degree from Montgomery College as well as a high school diploma.

MCPS is one of the few school districts in the nation that offers comprehensive services at the elementary, middle, and high school levels for twice-exceptional students. Twice-exceptional students have a unique profile of significant strengths and weaknessesthey are gifted and talented and also meet the criteria for an Individualized Education Program (IEP) or a Section 504 plan. Twice-exceptional students access accelerated and enriched instruction with appropriate support and services at their local school, a magnet/choice program, or a special education discrete service.

Language immersion programs are offered at several elementary and middle schools.

Schools
MCPS has 210 schools, comprising 136 elementary schools, 40 middle schools, 25 high schools, 5 special schools, 1 career and technology center, 1 early childhood learning center, and 1 alternative education program.

MCPS publishes school data annually. Its "Schools at a Glance" document provides information about enrollment, staffing, facilities, programs, outcome measures, and personnel costs for each school.

The district has 39 National Blue Ribbon Schools, a designation that recognizes public and private schools based on their overall academic excellence or their progress in closing achievement gaps among student subgroups.

The school system piloted an extended school year at two elementary schoolsArcola and Roscoe Nix elementary schoolsduring the 2018–2019 school year. The plan aims to help economically disadvantaged students, who lose the most ground during long summer breaks. As of 2022, the program is still in effect at these schools. The school began July 6 for the 2022–2023 school year, giving students an additional 30 days of school. The county says this extended schedule provides students interactive learning and social/emotional growth.

High schools

Middle schools 

 Argyle Middle School
 John T. Baker Middle School
 Benjamin Banneker Middle School
 Briggs Chaney Middle School
 Cabin John Middle School
 Roberto Clemente Middle School
 Eastern Middle School
 William H. Farquhar Middle School
 Forest Oak Middle School
 Robert Frost Middle School
 Gaithersburg Middle School
 Herbert Hoover Middle School
 Francis Scott Key Middle School
 Dr. Martin Luther King, Jr Middle School
 Kingsview Middle School
 Leland Junior High School (former)
 Lakelands Park Middle School (website)
 A. Mario Loiderman Middle School
 Montgomery Village Middle School
 Neelsville Middle School
 Newport Mill Middle School
 North Bethesda Middle School
 Parkland Middle School
 Rosa M. Parks Middle School
 John Poole Middle School
 Thomas W. Pyle Middle School
 Redland Middle School
 Ridgeview Middle School
 Rocky Hill Middle School
 Shady Grove Middle School
 Odessa Shannon Middle School
 Silver Creek Middle School
 Silver Spring International Middle School
 Sligo Middle School
 Takoma Park Middle School
 Tilden Middle School
 Hallie Wells Middle School
 Julius West Middle School
 Westland Middle School
 White Oak Middle School
 Earle B. Wood Middle School

Elementary schools 

 Arcola Elementary School
 Ashburton Elementary School
 Bannockburn Elementary School
 Lucy V. Barnsley Elementary School
 Beall Elementary School
 Bel Pre Elementary School (grades PreK–2)
 Bells Mill Elementary School
 Belmont Elementary School
 Bethesda Elementary School
 Beverly Farms Elementary School
 Bradley Hills Elementary School
 Brooke Grove Elementary School
 Brookhaven Elementary School
 Brown Station Elementary School
 Burning Tree Elementary School
 Burnt Mills Elementary School
 Burtonsville Elementary School
 Candlewood Elementary School
 Cannon Road Elementary School
 Carderock Springs Elementary School
 Rachel Carson Elementary School
 Cashell Elementary School
 Cedar Grove Elementary School
 Chevy Chase Elementary School (grades 3–5)
 Clarksburg Elementary School
 Clearspring Elementary School
 Clopper Mill Elementary School
 Cloverly Elementary School
 Cold Spring Elementary School
 College Gardens Elementary School
 Cresthaven Elementary School (grades 3–5)
 Capt. James Daly Elementary School
 Damascus Elementary School
 Darnestown Elementary School
 Diamond Elementary School
 Dr. Charles Drew Elementary School
 DuFief Elementary School
 East Silver Spring Elementary School
 Fairland Elementary School
 Fallsmead Elementary School
 Farmland Elementary School
 Fields Road Elementary School
 Flower Hill Elementary School
 Flower Valley Elementary School
 Forest Knolls Elementary School
 Four Corners Elementary School (closed) 
 Fox Chapel Elementary School
 Gaithersburg Elementary School
 Galway Elementary School
 Garrett Park Elementary School
 Georgian Forest Elementary School
 Germantown Elementary School
 William B. Gibbs, Jr. Elementary School
 Glen Haven Elementary School
 Glenallan Elementary School
 Goshen Elementary School
 Great Seneca Creek Elementary School
 Greencastle Elementary School
 Greenwood Elementary School
 Harmony Hills Elementary School
 Highland Elementary School
 Highland View Elementary School
 Jackson Road Elementary School
 Jones Lane Elementary School
 Kemp Mill Elementary School
 Kensington Parkwood Elementary School
 Lake Seneca Elementary School
 Lakewood Elementary School
 Laytonsville Elementary School
 JoAnn Leleck Elementary School
 Little Bennett Elementary School
 Luxmanor Elementary School
 Lynnbrook Elementary School (closed) 
 Thurgood Marshall Elementary School
 Maryvale Elementary School
 Spark M. Matsunaga Elementary School
 S. Christa McAuliffe Elementary School
 Dr. Ronald E. McNair Elementary School
 Meadow Hall Elementary School
 Mill Creek Towne Elementary School
 Monocacy Elementary School
 Montgomery Knolls Elementary School (grades PreK–2)
 New Hampshire Estates Elementary School (grades PreK–2)
 Roscoe R. Nix Elementary School (grades PreK–2)
 North Chevy Chase Elementary School (grades 3–5)
 Oak View Elementary School (grades 3–5)
 Oakland Terrace Elementary School
 Olney Elementary School
 William Tyler Page Elementary School
 Pine Crest Elementary School (grades 3–5)
 Piney Branch Elementary School (grades 3–5)
 Poolesville Elementary School
 Potomac Elementary School
 Judith A. Resnik Elementary School
 Dr. Sally K. Ride Elementary School
 Ritchie Park Elementary School
 Rock Creek Forest Elementary School
 Rock Creek Valley Elementary School
 Rock View Elementary School
 Lois P. Rockwell Elementary School
 Rolling Terrace Elementary School
 Rollingwood Elementary School (closed) 
 Rosemary Hills Elementary School (grades PreK–2)
 Rosemont Elementary School
 Bayard Rustin Elementary School
 Sequoyah Elementary School
 Seven Locks Elementary School
 Sherwood Elementary School
 Sargent Shriver Elementary School
 Flora M. Singer Elementary School
 Sligo Creek Elementary School
 Snowden Farm Elementary School (grades K–4)
 Somerset Elementary School
 South Lake Elementary School
 Stedwick Elementary School
 Stone Mill Elementary School
 Stone Gate Elementary School
 Strathmore Elementary School (grades 3–5)
 Strawberry Knoll Elementary School
 Summit Hall Elementary School
 Takoma Park Elementary School (grades K–2)
 Travilah Elementary School
 Twinbrook Elementary School
 Viers Mill Elementary School
 Washington Grove Elementary School
 Waters Landing Elementary School
 Watkins Mill Elementary School
 Wayside Elementary School
 Weller Road Elementary School
 Westbrook Elementary School
 Westover Elementary School
 Wheaton Woods Elementary School
 Whetstone Elementary School
 Wilson Wims Elementary School
 Wood Acres Elementary School
 Woodfield Elementary School
 Woodlin Elementary School
 Wyngate Elementary School

Notable alumni
The school system has several prominent graduates or former attendees, including: 
 Journalist Brian Stelter
 Journalist Carl Bernstein
 Journalist Connie Chung
 Baseball Player Curtis Pride
 Actor Daniel Stern
 TV Anchor Dan Heillie
 Television and Film Writer Darren Star
 Football Player Darrell Docket
 Comedian Dave Chappelle
 Musician Dean Felber
 Biologist Frederick Yeh
 Media Personality Giuliana Rancic
 Actress Goldie Hawn
 Olympic gold medalist Helen Maroulis
 Football Player Irvin Smith
 Journalist John Harwood
 Singer Joan Jett
 Actor John Michael Higgins
 Actor Jonathan Banks
 Rapper Logic
 Comedian Lewis Black
 Musician Mark Bryan
 Media Personality Mia Khalifa 
 Actor Michael Ealy
 33rd and 35th President of Chile Michelle Bachelet
 Creator of TV show Steven Universe, Rebecca Sugar
 TV anchor Scott Van Pelt 
 Entrepreneur Shervin Pishevar
 Actor Sylvester Stallone
 Director/screenwriter Spike Jonze
 Actor Sean Whalen
 Actor Thomas Jane
 Singer Tori Amos
 Rapper Wale
 Social Media Personality Katie Feeney

References

External links

MCPS at U.S. News & World Report′s Best High Schools
MCPS Maps and Geographic Information Systems

Reviews of Montgomery County Public Schools Special Education Programs

Education in Montgomery County, Maryland
Public schools in Montgomery County, Maryland
School districts in Maryland
1860 establishments in Maryland
School districts established in 1860